Human Desire is a 1919 American silent romantic drama film starring Anita Stewart who produced along with Louis B. Mayer. It was distributed by Associated First National.

A copy of Human Desire is preserved in the Library of Congress and the Academy Film Archive.

Plot
As described in a film magazine, the orphan Bernice (Stewart) is raised almost to womanhood by the good sisters in an Italian convent. Worshiping a picture of the Madonna and Child, she is seized by a great desire to have a child she can call her own. Running away to America, where she has been told babies are plentiful, she is taken in by Robert Bruce, an artist whose wife has refused to divorce him, and poses for his projected masterpiece, a Madonna. Bernice falls in love with the baby borrowed for this posing and is filled with sorrow when the child is taken away. Robert, who has become sincerely but honorably in love with the girl, adopts a baby for her. His wife meets Bernice and the baby, believes the worst, and insults her. Bernice takes the child and leaves the house, becoming lost in the city and finally finding refuge in a hospital where the child dies. Robert learns from his wife the reason for Bernice's departure, locates the girl, and, after divorcing his wife, marries her.

Cast
Anita Stewart as Bernice
Conway Tearle as Robert Bruce
Bob Steele as Jasper Norton
Eulalie Jensen as Helen
Naomi Childers as Marguerite Hunt
Templar Saxe as Paul Stapleton
Hattie Delaro as Miss March

References

External links

DVD Human Desire(Alpha Video)

1919 films
American silent feature films
Films based on American novels
First National Pictures films
American black-and-white films
American romantic drama films
1919 romantic drama films
Films directed by Wilfrid North
1910s American films
Silent romantic drama films
Silent American drama films